This is the entire list of episodes of My Parents Are Aliens, which were broadcast on ITV from 7 November 1999 to 18 December 2006.

Series overview

Episodes

Series 1 (1999)

Series 2 (2000)

Series 3 (2001)

Series 4 (2002)

Series 5 (2003)

Series 6 (2004)

Series 7 (2005)

Series 8 (2006)

Lists of British children's television series episodes